Anđelka Martić (1 May 1924 – 11 November 2020) was a Croatian writer and literary translator. She is best known for her children's war prose, especially for her novel Pirgo about a friendship of a boy and an orphan fawn in the whirlwind of the Second World War.

Biography 
Martić was born in Zagreb, as the second of three kids. Her father died young in 1933, and her sickly mother struggled to make ends meet, so she spent time with her grandparents in the countryside. Those visits became one of her main literary motifs.

On the verge of World War II she graduated from high school. After her brother, a resistance activist, got exposed and captured in 1941 by the Croatian puppet state militia, and executed in February 1942 at Jasenovac concentration camp, she joined the partisans and served as a war correspondent. At the end of war she took part in the liberation of Belgrade, earning the Yugoslav Order of Bravery medal for rescuing a wounded comrade.

Her first poems were published in journal Kulturni prilozi. After the war, she worked as a journalist for the newspapers Vjesnik and Omladinski borac and for the children's magazine Pionir. She was the editor-in-chief of the children's magazine Radost and the editor-in-chief of the publishing house Naša djeca. She has been a member of the Croatian Writers' Association since 1954.

Works 
Martić wrote poems, children’s books, and texts for picture books. She is the most prominent author of Croatian war prose for children; yet a few of her works are autobiographical books and fantastic prose in the best tradition of Croatian writer Ivana Brlić-Mažuranić. In her novel Pirgo, written in the first person, she tells a lyrical story about a war in which all beings suffer without distinction.

Her works have been translated into foreign languages ranging from Polish, Czech, Russian and Italian to Esperanto, Chinese and Persian. She herself translated a number of books from the Slovenian language.

Published works:

 Mali konjovodac i druge priče – Zagreb, 1951
 Bjelkan – Zagreb, 1951
 Pirgo – Zagreb, 1953
 Jezero u planini – Zagreb, 1956
 Vuk na Voćinskoj cesti – Zagreb, 1956
 U vihoru – Zagreb, 1958
 Dječak i šuma – Zagreb, 1960
 Kurir Dragan i njegovo konjče – Sarajevo, 1961
 Neugasivi životi – Zagreb, 1961
 Mali borac – Zagreb, 1964
 Proljeće, mama i ja – Zagreb, 1968
 Baba Kata – Zagreb, 1971
 Djedica Pričalo i čarobni vrutak – Zagreb, 1977
 Šašavi dani – Zagreb, 1978
 Mali konjovodac – Zagreb, 1985
 Izabrana djela in Pet stoljeća hrvatske književnost – Zagreb, 1991
 Zarobljenik šumske kuće – Zagreb, 1999
 Tri lisice i šumski car – Zagreb, 2002
 Dječak div i druge bajke – Zagreb, 2002

Awards 

For her literary work, Anđelka Martić was awarded the Yugoslav Order of Labor with Golden Wreath. In 1973, she received the Order of the Smile, a unique decoration awarded on behalf of the children of Poland. In 1977 Martić received Ivana Brlić Mažuranić Award for her book Djedica Pričalo i čarobni vrutak.

References 

Croatian writers
Croatian children's writers
Croatian women writers
Croatian women children's writers
1924 births
2020 deaths
Burials at Mirogoj Cemetery